The ARM Cortex-A is a group of 32-bit and 64-bit RISC ARM processor cores licensed by Arm Holdings.  The cores are intended for application use.  The group consists of 32-bit only cores: ARM Cortex-A5, ARM Cortex-A7, ARM Cortex-A8, ARM Cortex-A9, ARM Cortex-A12, ARM Cortex-A15, ARM Cortex-A17 MPCore, and  ARM Cortex-A32, 32/64-bit mixed operation cores: ARM Cortex-A35, ARM Cortex-A53, ARM Cortex-A55, ARM Cortex-A57, ARM Cortex-A72, ARM Cortex-A73, ARM Cortex-A75, ARM Cortex-A76, ARM Cortex-A77, ARM Cortex-A78, ARM Cortex-A710, and ARM Cortex-A510 Refresh, and 64-bit only cores: ARM Cortex-A34, ARM Cortex-A65, ARM Cortex-A510 (2021), and ARM Cortex-A715.

The 32-bit ARM Cortex-A cores, except for the Cortex-A32, implement the ARMv7-A profile of the  ARMv7 architecture.  The main distinguishing feature of the ARMv7-A profile, compared to the other two profiles, the ARMv7-R profile implemented by the ARM Cortex-R cores and the ARMv7-M profile implemented by most of the ARM Cortex-M cores, is that only the ARMv7-A profile includes a memory management unit (MMU). Many modern operating systems require a MMU to run.

The 64-bit ARM Cortex-A cores as well as the 32-bit ARM Cortex-A32 implement the ARMv8-A profile of the ARMv8 architecture.

Overview

ARM license
ARM Holdings neither manufactures nor sells CPU devices based on its own designs, but rather licenses the processor architecture to interested parties. ARM offers a variety of licensing terms, varying in cost and deliverables. To all licensees, ARM provides an integratable hardware description of the ARM core, as well as complete software development toolset, and the right to sell manufactured silicon containing the ARM CPU.

Silicon customization
Integrated device manufacturers (IDM) receive the ARM Processor IP as synthesizable RTL (written in Verilog). In this form, they have the ability to perform architectural level optimizations and extensions. This allows the manufacturer to achieve custom design goals, such as higher clock speed, very low power consumption, instruction set extensions, optimizations for size, debug support, etc.  To determine which components have been included in an ARM IC chip, consult the manufacturer datasheet and related documentation.

Instruction sets
The Cortex-A5 / A7 / A8 / A9 / A12 / A15 / A17 cores implement the ARMv7-A architecture.  The Cortex-A32 / A34 / A35 / A53 / A57 / A72 / A73 cores implement the ARMv8-A architecture. The Cortex-A55 / A65 / A75 / A76 / A77 / A78 cores implement the ARMv8.2-A architecture. The Cortex-A510, A710 and A715 cores implement the ARMv9-A architecture.

Documentation

A typical top-down documentation tree is:
 IC Manufacturer's high-level marketing slides
 IC Manufacturer datasheet for the exact physical chip
 IC Manufacturer Reference Manuals — describes common peripherals and other aspects of physical chips within the same series
 ARM Core Reference Manuals — for the exact ARM core processor within the chip
 ARM Architecture Reference Manuals — includes detailed description of all instruction sets of the core

IC Manufacturers usually have additional documents, including: evaluation board user manuals, application notes, getting started with development software, software library documents, errata, and more.

See also

 ARM architecture
 Comparison of ARMv7-A cores
 Comparison of ARMv8-A cores
 JTAG, SWD
 List of ARM microarchitectures and cores

References

External links

ARM Cortex-A official documents
 
{| class="wikitable" style="text-align:center;"
|-
! ARMCore !! BitWidth !! ARMWebsite !! ARM TechnicalReference Manual !! ARM ArchitectureReference Manual
|-
| style="background: LightCyan" | Cortex-A5 || 32 || Link || Link || rowspan=7 | ARMv7-A
|-
| style="background: LightCyan" | Cortex-A7 || 32 || Link || Link
|-
| style="background: LightCyan" | Cortex-A8 || 32 || Link || Link
|-
| style="background: LightCyan" | Cortex-A9 || 32 || Link || Link
|-
| style="background: LightCyan" | Cortex-A12 || 32 || colspan=2 
|-
| style="background: LightCyan" | Cortex-A15 || 32 || Link || Link
|-
| style="background: LightCyan" | Cortex-A17 || 32 || Link || Link
|-
| style="background: LightCyan" | Cortex-A32 || 32 || Link || Link || rowspan=4 | ARMv8-A
|-
| style="background: LightCyan" | Cortex-A34 || 64 || Link || Link
|-
| style="background: LightCyan" | Cortex-A35 || 32/64 || Link || Link
|-
| style="background: LightCyan" | Cortex-A53 || 32/64 || Link || Link
|-
| style="background: LightCyan" | Cortex-A55 || 32/64 || Link || Link || ARMv8.2-A
|-
| style="background: LightCyan" | Cortex-A57 || 32/64 || Link || Link || ARMv8-A
|-
| style="background: LightCyan" | Cortex-A510 || 64 (2021)32/64 (2022) || Link || Link || ARMv9-A
|-
| style="background: LightCyan" | Cortex-A65 || 64 || Link || Link || ARMv8.2-A
|-
| style="background: LightCyan" | Cortex-A72 || 32/64 || Link || Link || rowspan=2 | ARMv8-A
|-
| style="background: LightCyan" | Cortex-A73 || 32/64 || Link || Link
|-
| style="background: LightCyan" | Cortex-A75 || 32/64 || Link || Link || rowspan=4 | ARMv8.2-A
|-
| style="background: LightCyan" | Cortex-A76 || 32/64 || Link || Link
|-
| style="background: LightCyan" | Cortex-A77 || 32/64 || Link || Link
|-
| style="background: LightCyan" | Cortex-A78 || 32/64 || Link || Link
|-
| style="background: LightCyan" | Cortex-A710 || 32/64 || Link || Link || rowspan=2 | ARMv9-A
|-
| style="background: LightCyan" | Cortex-A715 || 64 || Link || Link
|}

Quick Reference Cards
 Instructions: Thumb (1), ARM and Thumb-2 (2), Vector Floating-Point (3) – arm.com
 Opcodes: Thumb (1, 2), ARM (3, 4), GNU Assembler Directives (5).

Migrating
 Migrating from MIPS to ARM – arm.com
 Migrating from PPC to ARM – arm.com
 Migrating from SH-4 to Cortex-A – arm.com
 Migrating from IA-32 (x86-32) to ARM – arm.com

ARM processors